Luisa Schulze (born 14 September 1990) is a German handball player for Metz Handball and the German national team.

She participated at the 2011 World Women's Handball Championship in Brazil. Since October 2016 she plays for German handball team SG BBM Bietigheim.

Achievements
EHF European League:
Winner: 2022
Bundesliga:
Winner: 2017, 2019, 2022

References

External links

1990 births
Living people
German female handball players
People from Altenburg
Sportspeople from Thuringia
21st-century German women